Corpus Mortale is a Danish death metal group. Established in 1993, the band has released three full-length albums.

History
Corpus Mortale was founded in Copenhagen in 1993 by Nicholas Maschøln and Søren Jensen, followed by Martin Rosendahl completing the lineup in 1994. From the beginning, the band was interested in playing death metal, and released their demo Corpus Mortale in 1995 to critical acclaim. Positive feedback spurred the band to double down on their recording efforts and Morten Jensen was recruited as a fourth member on guitar in 1996. Shortly after Jensen joined, Corpus Mortale entered the studio to record their second demo, Integration. This second project received a reception that outperformed the first; all 800 copies were sold out within 7 months.

After a number of tours between 1997 and 1999 and a third recording attempt, the unreleased album Spritism, Søren and Morten Jensen decided to leave the band. They were replaced by Brian Eriksen and Jens Lee (formerly of Iniquity) and a final demo, Succumb to the Superior was released. The release of this demo saw a widely positive response and label interest.

In the summer of 2001, Jens Lee left the band due to commitment issues. After another MCD, Sombre and Vile, the band focused on the release of their first full-length album, With Lewd Demeanor. Following this album's release, the band signed with Dutch record label Neurotic Records. The album released on 23 November 2003, supported by a European tour with Konkhra, Homo Iratus and Illnath. A music video for the song Mass Funeral Pyre soon followed. Brian Eriksen was replaced on guitar by Mads Hårløv (ex-Iniquity) as a session member.

With this new lineup, the band entered the studio to record Seize the Moment of Murder, a 3 track EP on Nuclear Winter Records. In 2007 they released their second full-length album, A New Species of Deviant through Willowtip Records in the USA and Neurotic Records in the rest of the world. Once more, the band's lineup would undergo changes, as Brian Eriksen rejoined with the negotiation of a contract renewal, and Nicholas Maschøln left after fourteen years. Rasmus Scmidt (The Omnihil, ex-Downlord) replaced Nicholas and the band continued to tour.

In October 2008, after seven years in Corpus Mortale, Roar Christoffersen decided to leave the band to concentrate on his other music project, Bastards. Corpus Mortale quickly found a replacement for Christoffersen in Andreas Lynge of The Cleansing. Andreas played his first gig in Corpus Mortale at the Copenhagen Death Fest on 6 December, and the Royal Metal Fest on 9 January in Århus.

In September of 2009, Corpus Mortale signed to the American label Deepsend Records. Deepsend released the Danes’ third album FleshCraft in 2013, with a special web-only pre-order which shipped before the release date in stores.

Former members
Ulrik Pedersen (Justin Hate Revolting Phimosis) - vocals
Morten Juul Nielsen - guitars 
Jakob Schleiss - bass 
Morten Jensen (Crapulence) - guitars
Søren Jensen (Granhammer, Iron Fire, Human Machine, Crapulence, Six String Slaughter) - guitars
Jens Lee (Iniquity, Saturnus) - guitars
Mads Haarløv (Iniquity, Strangler, Swollen, Sacrificial, Atobic, Ashes) - guitars
Nicholas Maschøln (Human Machine, Six String Slaughter) - drums 
Roar Christoffersen (Crapulence, Slow Death Factory) - guitars
Rasmus Schmidt (The Omnihil) - drums
Andreas Lynge (The Cleansing) - guitars

Discography

Studio albums
With Lewd Demeanor (2003)
A New Species of Deviants (2007)
Fleshcraft (2013)

EPs
Succumb to the Superior (2001)
Sombre & Vile (2002)
Seize the Moment of Murder (2006)

Demos
Corpus Mortale (1995)
Integration (1996)
Spiritism (1998)

References

External links
Official website
DeepSend Records Label

Technical death metal musical groups
Danish death metal musical groups
Danish heavy metal musical groups
Musical groups established in 1993
Musical quartets
1993 establishments in Denmark